Harry Kroger is an American physicist and electrical engineer.  He used to be a Bartle professor of electrical engineering at Binghamton University, a part of the State University of New York (SUNY) system.  He has been a member of the Institute of Electrical and Electronics Engineers (IEEE) since 1964 and became a Life Fellow of the IEEE in 2001. He initially retired to Florida, then moved back to Austin Texas.

Family
Dr. Kroger was married to  Mrs. Sandra Vought Kroger. They married in 1958. Sandy passed away in 2018, and Harry passed away in September 2022. They have three children; Charles Kroger (b 1960), John Kroger (b 1962), and Carolyn Kroger Estes (b 1964). He has ten grandchildren and two great grandchildren.

Education and career
Dr. Kroger received his B.S. degree from the University of Rochester in 1957 and the Ph.D. degree from Cornell University in 1962.  Both of his degrees are in physics.  The title of his doctoral dissertation was "Photon absorption by valence electrons in magnesium, chromium, iron and cobalt".

Dr. Kroger began his industrial research career at Sperry Research Center, Sudbury, MA, where he served as a Research Staff Member and in several management positions in semiconductor and superconductor electronics.  He then joined the Microelectronics and Computer Technology Corporation (MCC), Austin, TX, first as Technical Director of the Packaging/Interconnect Program, and later as Program Director for the Superconducting Electronics Program.

He joined the faculty of Binghamton University in 1992 as professor of electrical engineering and was director of the Integrated Electronics Engineering Center at Binghamton University from 1992 to 1998.  He retired from Binghamton University in 2002, however he continued to teach on a part-time basis with the title of Bartle Professor.

Harry retired to Venice, FL with his wife. They then moved back to Austin, TX to be closer to family prior to both Sandy and Harry passing.

Patents
5,981,869  Reduction of switching noise in high-speed circuit boards

5,434,530  Superconducting semiconducting cross-bar circuit
  
5,388,068  Superconductor-semiconductor hybrid memory circuits with superconducting three-terminal switching devices

5,024,993  Superconducting-semiconducting circuits, devices and systems

4,899,439  Method of fabricating a high density electrical interconnect

4,681,666  Planarization of a layer of metal and anodic aluminum

4,544,937  Formation of normal resistors by degenerate doping of substrates

4,536,781  Fabrication of superconductive tunneling junction resistors and short circuits by ion implantation

4,536,414  Superconductive tunnel junction device with enhanced characteristics and method of manufacture

4,490,733  Josephson device with tunneling barrier having low density of localized states and enhanced figures of merit

4,437,761  Refractive index temperature sensor

4,421,785  Superconductive tunnel junction device and method of manufacture

4,224,630  Multiple weak-link SQUID

4,220,959  Josephson tunnel junction with polycrystalline silicon, germanium or silicon-germanium alloy tunneling barrier

4,177,476  Multiple weak-link SQUID with non-superconductive material weak-links

4,176,365  Josephson tunnel junction device with hydrogenated amorphous silicon, germanium or silicon-germanium alloy tunneling barrier

4,142,112  Single active element controlled-inversion semiconductor storage cell devices and storage matrices employing same

3,979,613  Multi-terminal controlled-inversion semiconductor devices

Publications
Dr. Kroger has published more than 60 papers in refereed journals and conference proceedings.  One of his papers is available online for free:

External links
 Dr. Kroger's bio page on the Binghamton University electrical engineering department website
 The Integrated Electronics Engineering Center 
 Binghamton University's electrical and computer engineering department

References

Cornell University alumni
Binghamton University faculty
University of Rochester alumni
21st-century American physicists
State University of New York faculty
Fellow Members of the IEEE
Living people
Year of birth missing (living people)